Hans Niederhauser (born 15 February 1929) is a Swiss boxer. He competed in the men's middleweight event at the 1952 Summer Olympics.

References

External links
 

1929 births
Possibly living people
Swiss male boxers
Olympic boxers of Switzerland
Boxers at the 1952 Summer Olympics
Place of birth missing (living people)
Middleweight boxers